Edward Emerson Simmons (1852-1931) was an American Impressionist painter, remembered for his mural work.

Biography
His father was a Unitarian minister. He graduated from Harvard College in 1874, and was a pupil of Lefebvre and Boulanger in Paris, where he took a gold medal.  In 1894, Simmons was awarded the first commission of the Municipal Art Society, a series of murals—Justice, The Fates, and The Rights of Man—for the interior of the Criminal Courthouse at 100 Centre Street in Manhattan. This court is the criminal branch of New York Supreme Court (the trial court in New York), where many New Yorkers serve on jury duty. Later Simmons decorated the Waldorf Astoria New York hotel, the Library of Congress in Washington, and the mural series "Civilization of the Northwest" in the Minnesota State Capitol rotunda in Saint Paul.

In the year 1914, he travelled with Childe Hassam to view the Arizona desert paintings of the rising California artist Xavier Martinez at his Piedmont studio.
  
Simmons was a member of the Ten American Painters, who, as a group, seceded from the Society of American Artists.  He was also considered a contributor to the style known as the American Renaissance, a movement after the American Civil War that stressed the relationship of architecture, painting, sculpture and interior design.

Simmons published his autobiography in 1922.

Vandalism of Painting
In 1996 his painting "The Carpenter’s Son" located in the First Unitarian Church, New Bedford, Massachusetts, was yanked from the wall and cut out from its frame. The section depicting Jesus taken cutout and removed with the rest of the painting left lying on the floor. The lost section was found in 2006 rolled up behind a refrigerator when it was being removed from the congregation’s kitchen. The painting was then restored and ownership transferred to the Rotch-Jones-Duff House and Garden Museum.

Gallery

Civilization of the Northwest Gallery

Melpomene mural (Library of Congress)

References

Edward Simmons, From Seven to Seventy: Memories of a Painter and a Yankee, with an Interruption by Oliver Herford.  New York: Harper & Brothers, 1922. Oliver Herford (1863–1935) was an American author and illustrator.

External links

1852 births
1931 deaths
St Ives artists
19th-century American painters
American male painters
20th-century American painters
American Impressionist painters
American muralists
Harvard College alumni
Académie Julian alumni
19th-century American male artists
20th-century American male artists